Triplemanía XXXI is an upcoming three-day professional wrestling event promoted and produced by the Mexican professional wrestling promotion Lucha Libre AAA Worldwide (AAA or Triple A). The event will be held on April 16, July 15, and August 12, 2023. The April 16 event will take place at Estadio de Béisbol Monterrey in Monterrey, the July 15 event will take place at Estadio Chevron in Tijuana and the August 12 event at Arena Ciudad de México in Mexico City. It will mark the 31st year in a row that AAA will hold a Triplemanía show and comprise the 40th, 41st, and 42nd overall shows held under the Triplemanía banner since 1993. The annual Triplemanía show is AAA's biggest event of the year, serving as the culmination of major storylines in what has been described as AAA's version of WrestleMania or their Super Bowl event. 

The event will be themed around the Guerra de Rivalidades tournament, in which four pareja increíble tag teams will compete in matches across the three nights, with the winning team facing each other in a Lucha de Apuestas match on the third night.

Production

Background
2023 will mark the 31st year that the Mexican professional wrestling company Lucha Libre AAA Worldwide (Triple A or AAA) has held their annual flagship Triplemanía show. Triplemanía XXXI will comprise three shows – the 40th, 41st, and 42nd overall Triplemanía shows promoted by AAA (AAA promoted more than one Triplemanía event from 1994 to 1997 and from 2019 onward). Since the 2012 event, Triplemanía has taken place at the Arena Ciudad de México (Mexico City Arena), an indoor arena in Azcapotzalco, Mexico City, Mexico that has a maximum capacity of 22,300 spectators. On January 17, 2023, AAA announced that Triplemanía XXXI would be held across three days in three cities. In addition to Arena Ciudad de México, Triplemanía XXXI will be held in Estadio de Béisbol Monterrey and Estadio Chevron. Triplemanía XXXI will be the third Triplemanía event held outside of Arena Ciudad de México during the 2020s and the fourth outside Mexico City since 2007.

Triplemanía is the company's biggest show of the year, the AAA equivalent of WWE's WrestleMania or New Japan Pro-Wrestling's Wrestle Kingdom event.

Storylines
Triplemanía XXXI will feature an undetermined number of professional wrestling matches across the three nights, with different wrestlers involved in pre-existing scripted feuds, plots and storylines. Wrestlers will portray either heels (referred to as rudos in Mexico, those that portray the "bad guys") or faces (técnicos in Mexico, the "good guy" characters) as they engage in a series of tension-building events, which will culminate in a wrestling match.

During a press conference on January 17, 2023, AAA announced that Triplemanía XXXI would be themed around the Guerra de Rivalidades tournament, in which four pareja increíble tag teams will compete in matches across the three nights, with the winning team facing each other in a Lucha de Apuestas match on the third night. The teams participating in the tournament are Psycho Clown and Sam Adonis, Pagano and Rush El Toro Blanco, Pentagón Jr. and Alberto El Patrón, and Blue Demon Jr. and DMT Azul. On February 27, it was announced that Pagano was pulled from the tournament due to an injury and would be replaced by a mystery partner.

During a press conference on February 27, 2023, AAA announced that a Steel Cage match featuring 10 luchadores enmascarados would take place at the Triplemanía XXXI: Monterrey event. The last two wrestlers who do not escape from the cage will compete in a Lucha de Apuestas Mask vs. Mask match. The participants in the match were revealed as Laredo Kid, Antifaz del Norte, Octagón Jr., Villano III Jr., Argenis, Myzteziz Jr., Aero Star, La Parka Negra, Dralístico, and Taurus.

Matches

Triplemanía XXXI: Monterrey (April 16)

Guerra de Rivalidades tournament bracket

See also
2023 in professional wrestling

References

2023 in professional wrestling
Triplemanía
April 2023 events in Mexico
June 2023 events in Mexico
August 2023 events in Mexico
2023 in Mexico